Armed Services Editions (ASEs) were small paperback books of fiction and nonfiction that were distributed in the American military during World War II. From 1943 to 1947, some 122 million copies of more than 1,300 ASE titles were published and printed by the Council on Books in Wartime (CBW) and distributed to service members, with whom they were enormously popular.

This list of all 1,322 ASEs is based, unless otherwise indicated, on the data in appendix B to Molly Guptill Manning's book When Books Went To War (2014), a history of the ASEs and related efforts to promote wartime reading in the United States. Some full author names are taken from the list in the appendix to John Y. Cole's study of the ASEs from 1984. The notes about whether a book was a reprint (there were 99 reprints of reprints), abridged, or a "made" book (special anthologies of stories or verse, many of which were compiled by Louis Untermeyer) are based on the indications in Editions for the Armed Services, Inc.: A History (1948).

List

Notes

References

Lists of books